Aye Lwin was a six-time Burmese national chess championship winner. He won in 1980, 1983, 1984, 1986, 1987 and 1991.

References

1958 births
Burmese chess players
2016 deaths